Helen Nilsson  (born 24 November 1970) is a Swedish footballer who played as a forward for the Sweden women's national football team. She was part of the team at the 1991 FIFA Women's World Cup and 1995 FIFA Women's World Cup. At the club level she played for Gideonsbergs IF in Sweden.

References

External links
 

1970 births
Living people
Swedish women's footballers
Sweden women's international footballers
Place of birth missing (living people)
1991 FIFA Women's World Cup players
1995 FIFA Women's World Cup players
Women's association football forwards
Sundsvalls DFF players
Gideonsbergs IF players